The 2018 South American Games was a multi-sport event that took place in Cochabamba, Bolivia. It was the 11th edition of the ODESUR South American Games.

A total of 373 sporting events are scheduled to be contested across a variety of sports.

Background 
Bolivia, Venezuela and Peru submitted a bid to ODESUR to become host. Following a unanimous decision, the organization awarded it to the city of Cochabamba, as the other cities Lima and Puerto La Cruz withdrew their candidacies.

Participating nations 
14 countries competed at the games.

 (534 athletes)
 (10)
 (617) (hosts)
 (316)
 (449)
 (461)
 (234)
 (11)
 (55)
 (252)
 (447)
 (13)
 (217)
 (394)

Sports

Medal table

References

External links 
 Official website, in Spanish

 
South American Games
South American Games
South American Games
South American Games
Multi-sport events in Bolivia
International sports competitions hosted by Bolivia
South American Games
South American Games
Qualification tournaments for the 2019 Pan American Games